Barić is a Croatian surname.  People with the name include:
Gordan Barić (born 1994), Croatian footballer
Henrik Barić (1888-1957), Croatian linguist and Albanologist
Hrvoje Barić (born 1965), Croatian former swimmer
Josip Barić (born 1994), Dutch football player of Croatian descent
Lana Barić (born 1979), Croatian actress
Mario Barić (born 1985), Bosnian Croat footballer
Otto Barić (1933–2020), Croatian former football manager and footballer
Ralph S. Baric (born 1954), American virologists

See also 
Bajrić

References

Croatian surnames